M. americanus may refer to:
 Menticirrhus americanus, a kingcroaker species in the genus Menticirrhus
 Merganser americanus, a duck species
 Metasiro americanus, a harvestman species in the genus Metasiro
 Monomitopus americanus, an eel species in the genus Monomitopus
 Morone americanus, a bass species

See also
 Americanus (disambiguation)